Wakhanaq, or Wak'a'nakw, meaning "real river" in Kwak'wala, was a village of the Kwakwaka'wakw located on the north side of Gilford Island at the head of Wakhana Bay.  The centre of Wahkana Bay, which is immediately south of Kwatsi Bay across Tribune Channel, is at 

The village site was used by the (Southern) Kwakiutl, Kwicksataineuk and Kweeha (Kwiakah) groups of Kwakwaka'wakw.  Franz Boas recounted that the Kwakiutl and Kweeha had their origins here.

See also
List of Kwakwaka'wakw villages

References

Central Coast of British Columbia
Kwakwaka'wakw villages
Unincorporated settlements in British Columbia